Amana angulifera is a moth in the family Epicopeiidae. It was described by Francis Walker in 1855. It is found in India.

References

Moths described in 1855
Epicopeiidae